A gupti is a traditional swordstick dagger from India that can be completely concealed in a wooden case and resembles a walking cane or short stick.

References

External links 

Weapons of India
Daggers
Walking sticks